Bishops' House is a half-timbered house in the Norton Lees district of the City of Sheffield, England. It was built  and is located on the southern tip of Meersbrook Park. It is one of the three surviving timber-framed houses in the city (the others being the Old Queen's Head and Broom Hall).

It is known as Bishops' House because it was said to have been built for two brothers, John and Geoffrey Blythe, both of whom became Bishops. There is, however, no evidence that they ever lived in this house—the first known resident is William Blythe, a farmer and scythe manufacturer, who was living here in 1627.

Samuel Blyth was the last of the family to live in the house, dying in 1753, after which his sons sold the house to a William Shore. The Blyth family subsequently moved to Birmingham. Notable descendants were Benjamin Blyth, Sir Arthur Blyth and Benjamin Blyth II. The house was subsequently let to a tenant farmer and his labourer, at which point the house was sub-divided into two dwellings.

In 1886 ownership passed to the Corporation (Sheffield City Council) and various recreation department employees lived in the house until 1974.

It is a Grade II* listed building and has been open as a museum since 1976, following a renovation funded by English Heritage and Sheffield City Council.  The Sheffield Galleries and Museums Trust managed the building for some years until April 2011, when management of public opening, on behalf of the building's owner Sheffield City Council, was conferred to the Friends of Bishops' House.  The building is open to the public on Saturdays and Sundays between 10am and 4pm.  In April 2012 Sheffield Galleries and Museums Trust stopped providing educational visits and the Friends of Bishops' House began opening the house to schools also.  The displays in the house have had some recent small changes but are still curated by Museums Sheffield.  The Friends of Bishops' House is a registered charity and limited company, run entirely by volunteers.  The house contains exhibitions on life in the 16th and 17th centuries with two rooms decorated in Jacobean style.

The building is featured on the cover of local band Monkey Swallows the Universe's second album The Casket Letters.

See also
Listed buildings in Sheffield

References

External links 
 Friends of Bishops' House

Houses completed in 1500
Museums established in 1976
Grade II* listed buildings in Sheffield
Country houses in South Yorkshire
Museums in Sheffield
Historic house museums in South Yorkshire
Timber framed buildings in Yorkshire